The many-colored fruit dove (Ptilinopus perousii), also known as manuma in the Samoan language, is a species of bird in the family Columbidae. It occurs on islands in the south-west Pacific Ocean where it is found in Fiji, the Samoan Islands, and Tonga. Its natural habitat is subtropical or tropical moist lowland forests. Today, the birds are most often found in Fiji and Tonga. It usually feeds high in the canopy on fruit and berries, especially banyan fig. The nest is a small platform of twigs where one white egg is laid.

Description 

It is a small dove,  in length. The male is mostly pale yellow-white with a red crown and red bar across the back. The female is mostly green, darker on the back and greyer on the head and breast. Her crown is red while the undertail-coverts are red in Samoan birds and yellow in birds from Fiji and Tonga.

Male Ptilinopus perousii perousii is pale on the bottom and yellow on top. There is also a crimson band and corona. The female is said to resemble the purple-capped fruit dove; however, there is no yellow band. They have grey on the bottom while green on top. It only has a crimson corona unlike the male.

Taxonomy 
The many-colored fruit dove is in the columbid family with the other doves and pigeons. It a fruit dove meaning it belongs to genus Ptilinopus. However, it is very far from most other doves and has no close relatives due to it being endemic to the South Pacific islands. The two subspecies are Ptilinopus perousii mariae and P. p. perousii. The mariae subspecies is found in Fiji and Tonga. 

Its English name is literal: it is a many-colored dove that eats fruit. The Samoan name manuma means shy bird and comes from the Samoan words for bird and shame. Their Latin name honors Captain Jean Francois de Galaup Comte de la Pérouse of the French navy and explored the Pacific.

Distribution and habitat 

Manuma are found across many islands and archipelagos across Polynesia with a range of 660,000 sq. km. They are most often found in Fiji and Tonga. They can be found in lowland subtropical and tropical broadleaf forests. In these forests, they are found in the canopies. They can also be found in urban areas. The manuma's fossil range is from 0.12 million years ago to today, exclusively in the quaternary.

Behavior

Diet 
The many-colored fruit dove is a frugivore. It forages the canopies of trees in search of figs. On Samoa and American Samoa it is mostly the banyan. This strict diet keeps the two fig species in check; however, any decline in the amount of figs may be a disaster for the many-colored fruit dove.

Social 
Manuma are often found in small flocks. In each flock there are normally more males than females.

Status 
While not listed as threatened or endangered by the International Union for Conservation of Nature (IUCN), their population is in decline in American Samoa. The justification of the conservation status is that the decline is not extreme enough and the restricted area is not small enough for the vulnerability status.

In the 19th and early 20th centuries, large numbers of this bird were reported on Tutuila, American Samoa. In the 1970s, a population survey found there were around 80 individuals present. In the 1990s, there were 50 individuals on Tutuila reported.

Biologists with the American Samoa Department of Marine and Wildlife Resources and workers from Pacific Bird Conservation and the Toledo Zoo captured four many-colored fruit dove to begin a captive breeding project at Association of Zoos and Aquariums facilities. 

The many-colored fruit dove chief food source, the banyan fruit, are also in decline due to deforestation and their susceptibility to storm damage. In the 1990s, Cyclone Val and Cyclone Ofa killed or damaged a number of banyan trees, or otherwise stripped them bare of leaves and fruit. Hunting is another cause of the bird's decline on Tutuila. Hunters in search of lupe (Pacific imperial pigeon, Ducula pacifica) or manutagi (purple-capped fruit-doves, Ptilinopus porphyraceus) may kill many-colored fruit doves instead. In interviews conducted by American Samoa environmental officials, more than a quarter of hunters reported accidentally shooting a many-colored fruit dove.

References

Further reading
 Watling, Dick (2001) A Guide to the Birds of Fiji & Western Polynesia, Environmental Consultants (Fiji), Suva.

many-colored fruit dove
Birds of Fiji
Birds of Tonga
Birds of Samoa
Birds of the Pacific Ocean
many-colored fruit dove
Taxonomy articles created by Polbot
Taxa named by Titian Peale